The Anokhin Museum is a national museum located in Gorno-Altaysk, Altai Republic, Russia.

General Information
The Anokhin Museum is the national museum of the republic, located in Gorno-Altaysk, the capital city of Altai Republic, in the Chinese and Mongolian borders of the Russian Federation. It was opened in 2012, with the financial help of Gazprom and others, and is named after Andrey Anokhin, a Russian Turkologist and ethnographer.

The museum exhibits the famous "Siberian Ice Maiden" and holds a big archaeological collection.  Its address is:  
Choros-Gurkina ul., d. 46, Gorno-Altaysk 659700, Russia

Exhibits
 Siberian Ice Maiden
 Paintings by Grigory Gurkin

See also
 Andrey Anokhin

References

External links
 Official Site 
 Museum of Local Lore (Regional Studies) at Gorno-Altaysk State University

Art museums and galleries in Russia
Museums in Russia
Museums established in 2012
Gorno-Altaysk
2012 establishments in Russia
Buildings and structures in the Altai Republic